Woo Hee-jin (born May 24, 1975) is a South Korean actress. Woo began modeling in commercials when she was in sixth grade, then made her acting debut in 1987. She became a household name when she starred in campus drama Feelings (1994), sitcom Three Guys and Three Girls and Moon Lovers: Scarlet Heart Ryeo

Filmography

Television series

Film

Variety/radio show

Awards and nominations

References

External links 
 Woo Hee-jin Fan Cafe at Daum 
 Woo Hee-jin at HM Entertainment 
 
 
 

1975 births
Living people
South Korean television actresses
South Korean film actresses
People from Seoul
Seoul Institute of the Arts alumni
Danyang U clan